Keltainen Pörssi (Finnish for "the yellow stock market") was Finland's most popular small ads magazine. The magazine was established in 1986 and was part of Sanoma. Ilta-Sanomat Oy was the publisher of the magazine of which the headquarters was in Helsinki.

It was available both as a print edition published twice per week and a free online edition, and consisted entirely of small ads by private citizens. These ads were divided into categories for easy browsing. Placing an ad was free of charge, but extra stand-out features and photographs costed money.

Keltainen Pörssi had several supplements, including Autot.

In June 2016 the publication was wound down and visits to the web address directed users to the Huuto.net site, this is an online auction and buy it now  site similar to eBay that caters for the Finnish market. Keltainen Pörssi was owned by the same media group with Huuto.net and Ilta-Sanomat.

References

1986 establishments in Finland
2016 disestablishments in Finland
Business magazines published in Finland
Defunct magazines published in Finland
Finnish-language magazines
Magazines about advertising
Magazines established in 1986
Magazines disestablished in 2016
Magazines published in Helsinki